The Ravenswood is a historic apartment building in Art Deco style at 570 North Rossmore Avenue in the Hancock Park neighborhood of Los Angeles, California. It was designed by Max Maltzman, and built by Paramount Pictures in 1930 just five blocks from the corner of Paramount's studios on Melrose Avenue.

Mae West lived in the penthouse from its 1930 opening until her 1980 death. West, who invested in property throughout the Los Angeles area, bought the building when the management barred her then-boyfriend, African American boxer William "Gorilla" Jones, from entering the premises.  James Timony, West's long time manager, close friend, and one-time boyfriend (pre-1930's), lived in the building until his death in 1954. Other residents have included Ava Gardner and Clark Gable, at different times.

The Ravenswood was designated a Los Angeles Historic-Cultural Monument in 2003.

See also 
 List of Los Angeles Historic-Cultural Monuments in the Wilshire and Westlake areas

References 

Art Deco architecture in California
Culture of Hollywood, Los Angeles
Los Angeles Historic-Cultural Monuments
Buildings and structures in Hollywood, Los Angeles
Residential buildings completed in 1930
Residential buildings in Los Angeles